Pure McCartney is the fourth compilation album by Paul McCartney. The album was released on 10 June 2016.

Background
The album was first teased in late March 2016 by cryptic video posts placed on McCartney's Facebook and Twitter pages. He also says: There are no cover versions, which may be in line with the "pure" concept.

When the album was announced by McCartney on 31 March 2016, he downplayed the use of "career" in describing the collection, rather referring to it as representative of a "musical adventure". He also noted he and his team compiled the tracks for the alternate track listings "with nothing else in mind other than having something fun to listen to" in different settings.

The album features tracks from all of his official studio albums with the exception of Снова в СССР, Flowers in the Dirt, Run Devil Run and Driving Rain.

Critical reception
Pablo Gorondi from ABC News says: "Pure McCartney is a substantial, honest and gratifying introduction to the long and winding career of a pop music giant, a tasting menu whetting the appetite for more".

Track listing
Three versions of the album have been released, a two-disc CD of 39 tracks, a four-disc LP of 41 tracks (adding tracks "New" and "Too Many People") and a four-disc CD (and deluxe digital edition) of 67 tracks. All songs are written by Paul McCartney, except where noted.

Standard edition

Disc 1

Disc 2

Deluxe edition

Disc 1

Disc 2

Disc 3

Disc 4

Charts

Weekly charts

Year-end charts

Certifications

See also
 Wings Greatest (1978), a compilation of hits by McCartney from 1971 to 1978, mostly done by Wings.
 All the Best! (1987), a compilation of McCartney's hits as a solo artist and with Wings between 1970 and 1987.
 Wingspan: Hits and History (2001), a compilation of McCartney's solo and Wings material from 1970's McCartney to 1984's Give My Regards to Broad Street.

References

2016 compilation albums
Concord Music Group compilation albums
Paul McCartney compilation albums
Virgin EMI Records albums
Albums produced by Chris Thomas (record producer)
Albums produced by George Martin
Albums produced by Paul McCartney
Albums recorded at Trident Studios
Albums recorded at Sea-Saint Studios
Albums recorded at Wally Heider Studios
Albums recorded at RAK Studios
Albums recorded at A&M Studios